Gregory H. Millen (born June 25, 1957) is a Canadian hockey commentator-analyst and a former professional ice hockey goaltender who played 14 seasons for six teams in the National Hockey League (NHL). He is currently a colour commentator on Hockey Night in Canada and the NHL on Sportsnet.

Playing career
As a youth, Millen played in the 1968, 1969 and 1970 Quebec International Pee-Wee Hockey Tournaments with minor ice hockey teams from Toronto.

Pittsburgh Penguins
The Toronto native was chosen 102nd overall by the Pittsburgh Penguins in the 1977 NHL amateur draft, while he was in the midst of a fine Ontario Hockey Association (OHA) season with the Sault Ste. Marie Greyhounds. He had played for the Peterborough Petes in the OHA from 1974 to 1977. In 1978–79, he looked solid in 28 games as a rookie and became a fan favourite at the Civic Arena in Pittsburgh. Two years later, Millen won 25 games and nearly led his team to a first round upset over the St. Louis Blues, losing the decisive fifth game in double overtime.

In spite of his post season heroics, the Penguins allowed Millen to leave the club that summer. In June 1981, the Hartford Whalers signed him as a restricted free agent; the Penguins had the right to match the offer but their general manager, Baz Bastien, was on vacation and was unaware that Millen had signed, and as a result the deadline for the Penguins to match passed.

Hartford Whalers
With the Whalers, Millen pushed incumbent starter John Garrett into the backup role and logged a heavy workload. After playing in 55 games for the Whalers in 1981–82, Millen represented Canada at the 1982 Ice Hockey World Championships. In 1983–84, he led the NHL with 60 appearances, but he could not get the lowly Whalers into the post-season. During the 1984–85 season he was involved in a blockbuster trade that sent him to the St. Louis Blues with Mark Johnson for goaltender Mike Liut and forward Jörgen Pettersson.

St. Louis Blues
In St. Louis, Millen formed a solid goalkeeping tandem with Rick Wamsley and helped the club reach the Conference Finals in 1986, where they were defeated in seven games by the Calgary Flames. During the Division Semifinal against the Minnesota North Stars, Millen started and won two games, including the series-clinching game 5. Then in the Division Final, St. Louis defeated the Toronto Maple Leafs 4 games to 3. He posted a record of 4–2 and once again was in net for the series clincher. He played in two of the Campbell Conference final games as Wamsley was the starter for the rest. Wamsley was traded to Calgary during the 1987–88 season, making Millen the undisputed starter in St. Louis and he enjoyed his best year with the club the following year. In 1988–89, Millen registered an NHL-high six shutouts along with 22 wins while making 52-starts, all highs for his Blues career.

The following year netminder Vincent Riendeau began taking a bigger share of the starts and with college free agent Curtis Joseph in the wings, Millen was being pushed out. On December 13, 1989, Millen was packaged with centre Tony Hrkac and traded to the lowly Quebec Nordiques in exchange for offensive defenseman Jeff Brown. Millen was shocked by deal. "I was devastated. My family was just entrenched in St. Louis. We were involved with the community and we really enjoyed St. Louis an awful lot."

Quebec Nordiques
With the Nordiques, Millen won only 3 of 18 starts while his goals against average ballooned to 5.28. Clearly unhappy and with the team in last place, Millen wanted out. He made it clear to the management that he had no intention of playing out his career in that kind of situation. In March, the Nordiques included Millen in a package that saw Hall of Fame winger Michel Goulet leave the Nordiques in a six-player trade with the Chicago Blackhawks.

Chicago Blackhawks
The Blackhawks goaltending tandem has comprised Jacques Cloutier and Alain Chevrier in 1989–90, but the day after Millen was acquired, Chevrier was traded to the Pittsburgh Penguins. Millen played ten games down the stretch for the Blackhawks and was in net when the playoffs started. Chicago coach Mike Keenan was quick to change up his netminders and that spring actually saw three different goalies (Millen, Cloutier and rookie Ed Belfour) start games, but Millen, with 15 appearances led the way as the Hawks advanced all the way to the Western Conference Finals before losing to the Edmonton Oilers. The following season, Millen lost his starting job and nearly found himself out of the league altogether. Belfour took the starting job and ran with it playing 74 games and posting 43 wins and a stingy 2.24 goals against average. "Eddie answered the Bell," Millen explained. "He probably had as good a year I'd ever seen a goalie play in the NHL. It was a kick in rear for me, a little bit demoralizing." With Cloutier as Belfour's backup, and a Dominik Hašek now in the Chicago system, Millen was limited to just 58 minutes of game play in the entire season. Clearly his career as a Blackhawk was over. In September 1991, Millen was traded to the New York Rangers for future considerations.

New York Rangers
The Rangers were involved with prolonged contract negotiations with Mike Richter and they acquired Millen as an "insurance policy". The 1991–92 season started with Richter un-signed, so Millen was John Vanbiesbrouck's back-up for the first two games of the year. On October 7, the Rangers signed a new deal with Richter and Millen was assigned to the San Diego Gulls of the International Hockey League (IHL). After a five-game stint in the IHL, Millen was dealt to the Detroit Red Wings.

Detroit Red Wings
Detroit had Tim Cheveldae as their starting goaltender but needed a backup for the 1991–92 season. At the start of the year they had acquired Millen's former teammate Vincent Riendeau, who then injured his knee in his Detroit debut which sidelined him long term. Other solutions like Allan Bester and Scott King had not worked out, so the Red Wings made a move for Millen. With Cheveldae carrying a heavy load, Millen was used sparingly but made the last ten appearances of his career in the Red Wings net before hanging up his pads for good at the end of the season.

Broadcasting career
After ending his career, Millen became the colour commentator on television broadcasts for the expansion Ottawa Senators. During his eleven seasons affiliated with the Senators, his play-by-play partners included Don Chevrier, Rob Faulds, and Dean Brown. He also paired with Chevrier as the lead broadcasting team for CTV's ice hockey coverage at the 1994 Winter Olympics.

Beginning in the 1995 season, he joined the CBC's Hockey Night in Canada. After a year with CTV Sportsnet, he rejoined HNIC in 1999–2000 as the colour commentator of the network's secondary broadcast team, first paired with Chris Cuthbert and then Jim Hughson, mostly covering the second game of weekly doubleheader and three playoff rounds. He was promoted to the lead team in 2007, working alongside Bob Cole. In this role he worked on CBC's coverage of the 2007 and 2008 Stanley Cup Finals.

In 2005, he moved from the Senators to the Maple Leafs local broadcast team, and in 2007 he became the Leafs' lead television colour commentator, working alongside Joe Bowen on Sportsnet Ontario and Leafs TV.

As of 2014 he works exclusively for Rogers Communications, both on telecasts that are part of the national television contract under the Hockey Night in Canada, Rogers Monday Night Hockey or Scotiabank Wednesday Night Hockey banners. He previously worked as an analyst on Maple Leafs regional package that appears on Sportsnet Ontario.

Personal life
Millen is married and has four children, including a son, Charlie, who as of January 2019 was a goaltender for the Orlando Solar Bears of the ECHL.

Career statistics

Regular season and playoffs

International

References

External links
Greg Millen's Homepage

Greg Millen @ hockeygoalies.org

1957 births
Living people
Canadian colour commentators
Canadian ice hockey goaltenders
Canadian television sportscasters
Chicago Blackhawks players
Detroit Red Wings players
Hartford Whalers players
Ice hockey people from Toronto
National Hockey League broadcasters
Ottawa Senators announcers
Peterborough Petes (ice hockey) players
Pittsburgh Penguins draft picks
Pittsburgh Penguins players
Quebec Nordiques players
St. Louis Blues players
Sault Ste. Marie Greyhounds players
Toronto Maple Leafs announcers
Toronto Marlboros players
Edmonton Oilers announcers